Club Deportivo Quintanar del Rey is a Spanish football team based in Quintanar del Rey, in the autonomous community of Castile-La Mancha. Founded in 1984, it plays in Tercera División – Group 18, holding home games at Campo Municipal San Marcos, with a capacity of 2,000 seats.

Season to season

26 seasons in Tercera División

References

External links
Official website 
Futbolme team profile 

Football clubs in Castilla–La Mancha
Association football clubs established in 1996
1996 establishments in Spain
Province of Cuenca